The 41st Academy Awards were presented on April 14, 1969, to honor the films of 1968. They were the first Oscars to be staged at the Dorothy Chandler Pavilion, Los Angeles, and the first with no host since the 11th Academy Awards.

Oliver! became the only Best Picture winner to have received a G-rating prior to winning, the ratings system having replaced the old Hays Code on November 1, 1968 (though a number of Best Picture winners have received the rating retroactively). It was the last British film to win Best Picture until Chariots of Fire in 1981, and the last musical to win until Chicago in 2002.

The year was notable for the first—and so far, only—tie for Best Actress: Katharine Hepburn and Barbra Streisand shared the award, for their performances in The Lion in Winter and Funny Girl, respectively. Hepburn became the second actress and third performer to win an acting Oscar two years in a row (having won for Guess Who's Coming to Dinner the previous year), after Luise Rainer in 1936 (The Great Ziegfeld) and 1937 (The Good Earth), and Spencer Tracy in 1937 (Captains Courageous) and 1938 (Boys Town). She also became the first to win three acting Oscars in lead categories (an achievement later matched by Daniel Day-Lewis and Frances McDormand).

Stanley Kubrick received his only career Oscar this year, for Best Visual Effects as special effects director and designer for 2001: A Space Odyssey.

Cliff Robertson's performance in Charly, which had received a mixed-to-negative reception from critics and audiences, engendered controversy when he won the Academy Award for Best Actor. Less than two weeks after the ceremony, TIME mentioned the Academy's generalized concerns over "excessive and vulgar solicitation of votes" and said "many members agreed that Robertson's award was based more on promotion than on performance."

Also notable this year was the only instance to date of the Academy revoking an Oscar after the ceremony: Young Americans won the award for Best Documentary Feature Film, but on May 7, 1969, it was discovered that it had premiered in October 1967, thus making it ineligible. Journey into Self, the first runner-up, was awarded the Oscar the following day.

A minor controversy was created when, in a sketch on The Tonight Show, which was recorded three hours before the awards ceremony, Johnny Carson and Buddy Hackett announced Oliver! as the winner for Best Picture and Jack Albertson as Best Supporting Actor.  Columnist Frances Drake claimed that most observers believed Carson and Hackett "were playing a huge practical joke or happened to make a lucky guess". Referring to it as "The Great Carson Hoax", PricewaterhouseCoopers stated in a 2004 press release that it was "later proven that Carson and Hackett made a few lucky guesses for their routine, dispelling rumors of a security breach and keeping the integrity of the balloting process intact". Carson would go on to host the ceremony five times.

Winners and nominees

Nominees were announced on February 24, 1969. Winners are listed first, highlighted in boldface and indicated with a double dagger.

Multiple nominations and awards

These films had multiple nominations:
12 nominations: Oliver!
8 nominations: Funny Girl
7 nominations: The Lion in Winter and Star!
4 nominations: 2001: A Space Odyssey, Rachel, Rachel, and Romeo and Juliet
3 nominations: Faces
2 nominations: The Battle of Algiers, Bullitt, Finian's Rainbow, The Heart Is a Lonely Hunter, Ice Station Zebra, The Odd Couple, Planet of the Apes, The Producers, Rosemary's Baby, The Shoes of the Fisherman, The Subject Was Roses, The Thomas Crown Affair, and War and Peace

The following films received multiple awards:
6 wins: Oliver!
3 wins: The Lion in Winter
2 wins: Romeo and Juliet

Jean Hersholt Humanitarian Award
Martha Raye

Honorary Awards
Walter Matthau presented John Chambers his award for outstanding makeup achievement for Planet of the Apes.
Diahann Carroll presented Onna White her award for outstanding choreography achievement for Oliver!.

Presenters
Ingrid Bergman (Presenter: Best Actress and Best Cinematography)
Ingrid Bergman, Diahann Carroll, Jane Fonda, Rosalind Russell and Natalie Wood (Presenters: Best Director)
Diahann Carroll (Presenter: Best Special Visual Effects, Documentary Awards & the Honorary Award to Onna White)
Tony Curtis (Presenter: Best Supporting Actress, Short Subjects Awards and Documentary Awards)
Jane Fonda (Presenter: Best Foreign Language Film, Best Costume Design and Short Subjects Awards)
Bob Hope (Presenter: Jean Hersholt Humanitarian Award to Martha Raye)
Burt Lancaster (Presenter: Best Actor, Best Special Visual Effects and the Scientific or Technical Awards)
Mark Lester (Presenter: Honorary Academy Award to Onna White)
Henry Mancini and Marni Nixon (Presenter: Best Original or Adaptation Score)
Walter Matthau (Presenter: Best Film Editing and Best Foreign Language Film)
Gregory Peck (Presenter: Best Original Score for a Motion Picture (Not a Musical))
Pink Panther (Presentation: Best Short Subject – Cartoons)
Sidney Poitier (Presenter: Best Picture)
Don Rickles (Presenter: Best Story and Screenplay Written Directly for the Screen)
Rosalind Russell (Presenter: Best Original Score for a Motion Picture (Not a Musical), Best Sound and Screenplay Based on Material from Another Medium Awards)
Frank Sinatra (Presenter: Best Supporting Actor, Best Song Original for the Picture and Writing Awards)
Natalie Wood (Presenter: Best Art Direction and the Scientific or Technical Awards)

Performers
José Feliciano ("The Windmills of Your Mind" from The Thomas Crown Affair) 
Aretha Franklin ("Funny Girl" from Funny Girl)
Abbey Lincoln ("For Love of Ivy" from For Love of Ivy)
Paula Kelly and the UCLA Band ("Chitty Chitty Bang Bang" from Chitty Chitty Bang Bang)
Frank Sinatra ("Star!" from Star!)

See also 
 1968 in film
 11th Grammy Awards
 20th Primetime Emmy Awards
 21st Primetime Emmy Awards
 22nd British Academy Film Awards
 23rd Tony Awards
 26th Golden Globe Awards

References

Academy Awards ceremonies
1968 film awards
1968 awards in the United States
1969 in Los Angeles
1969 in American cinema
April 1969 events in the United States